Stephen Frasier Bollenbach (July 14, 1942 – October 8, 2016) was a financial manager who served as CEO and CFO for many hotel-related organizations. After working with financier Daniel K. Ludwig from 1968 to 1980, he oversaw mergers and acquisitions for various corporations to include Marriott Corporation, Holiday Corporation, Harrah's Entertainment, the Trump Organization, Disney, and Hilton Hotels. He served on various corporate boards, including the nonexecutive chairman of Los Angeles-based KB Home and a member of the board of directors of Time Warner. He served on the board of directors for American International Group, Inc. (AIG) during the 2007 financial crisis, and he was also a director of Harrah's Entertainment, Inc., Macy's, Inc., and the Los Angeles World Affairs Council.

Education
Bollenbach attended Lakewood High School (California), graduated from Long Beach City College, got a bachelor's degree in finance from UCLA in 1965, and a master's degree in management from the California State University, Northridge in 1968.

Career

Ludwig Group 
From 1968 until 1980 Bollenbach held a series of financial management positions with the Ludwig Group and helped to oversee some of his hotel properties. Bollenbach had been introduced to the organization by John L. Notter, who ultimately spent 15 years as the operating head of the D.K. Ludwig Group and became the chairman of the Ludwig Cancer Research. Bollenbach worked for Mr Ludwig for many years, helping to oversee some of his hotel properties. This work with Ludwig culminated as Bollenbach served as D. K. Ludwig's CFO from 1977 to 1980.

Bollenbach served as chairman and chief executive officer of Southwest Savings and Loan Association in Phoenix from 1980 to 1982.

1982: Marriott 
He served as senior vice president of finance and treasurer for the Marriott Corporation from 1982 to 1986. In 1982, the company acquired Host International for $120 million and also Gino's Inc., the owner of Gino's Hamburgers and Rustler Steak House restaurant chains, for $48.6 million. 108 Rustler Steak House Restaurants plus three other restaurants were sold in the following year to two different firms (Tenly Enterprises and Sizzler Restaurants International) for undisclosed amounts. Newly formed Tenly Enterprises purchased 94 restaurants while Sizzler Restaurants International purchased the remaining 17. The Gino's chain had 359 company-owned locations when Marriott Corporation acquired it in 1982. Marriott discontinued the brand and converted locations to its Roy Rogers Restaurants chain. The last Gino's, located in Pasadena, Maryland and owned independently from Marriott, closed in 1986.

1986: Holiday Corp. 
He then served as chief financial officer and a member of the board of directors of Holiday Corporation from 1986 to 1990. Holiday Inns, Inc. was renamed "Holiday Corporation" in 1985 to reflect the growth of the company's brands, including Harrah's Entertainment, Embassy Suites Hotels, Crowne Plaza, Homewood Suites, and Hampton Inn. In 1988, Holiday Corporation was purchased by UK-based Bass PLC (the owners of the Bass beer brand). During his time at Holiday, Bollenbach helped prevent Trump from using a leveraged buyout to take over the hotel chain.

1990–1992: Trump Organization 
After a brief stint with Promus Companies (a corporate spin-off affiliated with Caesars Entertainment and Harrah's Entertainment) in 1990, Bollenbach became the first CFO of the Trump Organization in 1990 while Allen Weisselberg served under him as comptroller.

1992–1995: Marriott 
Bollenbach returned to Marriott Hotels in 1992

1995–1995 Disney 
In 1995, Bollenbach replaced Richard Nanula as the CFO for Disney. In this position, he crafted Disney's $19-billion deal to buy Capital Cities/ABC in 1995.

1996–2007 Hilton 
Bollenbach was the co-chairman and chief executive officer of Hilton Hotels Corporation beginning in February 1996. He was the first person outside the Hilton Family to hold this position.
Bollenbach aimed to expand Hilton's gaming holdings through acquisitions, especially in Atlantic City, where Hilton had no presence. Bally Entertainment, with five casinos, including two in Atlantic City, was a natural target. Its midscale clientele, heavy on slots revenue, would provide balance to the volatility of Hilton's high-end baccarat players. Hilton beat out ITT Corporation with an offer of $2 billion in stock plus $1 billion of assumed debt, and the purchase closed in December 1996.  In 2007, Bollenbach left after making the sale of Hilton to The Blackstone Group for $26 Billion.

2008–2009 AIG 
In January 2008 he was elected to the board of directors for American International Group, Inc. (AIG). At that time he was also listed as "Chairman of the Board of KB Home and a Director of Harrah’s Entertainment, Inc., Time Warner Inc. and Macy’s, Inc. He also served as a member of the Board of Directors of Teach for America and Los Angeles World Affairs Council." AIG was a central player in the financial crisis of 2008. It was bailed out by the federal government for $180 billion, and the government took control.")  In June of 2008, AIG fired Chief Executive Officer Martin Sullivan, replaced him with Robert Willumstad as CEO and appointed Bollenbach as "lead independent director." Willumstad left after three months on the job and was replaced by Chairman and Chief Executive Officer Edward M. Liddy, who was dismissed by the board in May 2009. after this resignation and AIG's announcement that it would name six new independent directors, Bollenbach himself left in 2009 along with Martin Feldstein, James Orr, Virginia Rometty, Michael Sutton, Edmund Tse, and Ed Liddy after working on bailout.

Personal life, and death
According to a Ludwig Cancer Research Center memorial, “He was an avid traveler who loved to ski, drive sports cars, golf and collect wine. Steve established the Bollenbach Family Scholarship, which sends 15 deserving and financially challenged students each year to college.” 

Bollenbach divorced his first wife Barbara in 2010. He married Kimberly in 2011. At his death, he and his wife lived in East Gate Bel Air section of Los Angeles, California. He had two grown sons (by his first wife) Christopher and Keat, and two grandchildren. He died at the age of 74 after a long illness in Manhattan, New York on October 8, 2016.

References

External links
Stephen F. Bollenbach Biography, Time Warner

1942 births
2016 deaths
People from Los Angeles
California State University, Northridge alumni
American chief executives of travel and tourism industry companies
American chief financial officers
Warner Bros. Discovery people
Disney executives